The Guard Hussar Regiment is a cavalry unit of the Royal Danish Army, whose primary task is to train the Guard Hussars for various functions in the mobilisation force.  The Guard Hussar Regiment is one of two active cavalry regiments of the Danish Army, and was formed in 2001 through the amalgamation of the original Guard Hussars regiment, Zealand Life Regiment and Danish Life Regiment.

History

Origins of the regiment

Although the Guard Hussars themselves date from 10 February 1762, the Danish Army takes the date of the founding of a regiment from its oldest part, in this case the Zealand Life Regiment, which was founded in 1614. This makes the Guard Hussars one of the oldest regiments of hussars in the world still operational, it is also the only hussars in mounted parade uniform to still wear the slung and braided pelisse which was formerly characteristic of this class of cavalry. In addition to its operational role, the Guard Hussar Regiment is one of two regiments in the Danish Army (along with the Den Kongelige Livgarde) to be classed as 'Guards'; in this case, the Mounted Squadron perform the same role as the Household Cavalry do in the British Army.

From 1961 to 1972 the regiment was responsible for two armoured battalions, one recon battalion. From 1972–2000 the regiment was responsible for one armoured, one mechanised infantry, one reconnaissance and one infantry battalions. From 2000–2004 the regiment was responsible for two armoured, two mechanised infantry, one reconnaissance and two infantry battalions. From 1992–2004 the regiment also had to form two light Reconnaissance Squadrons assigned to the 1st Zealand Brigade and Danish International Brigade.

2001 amalgamation

As part of the Defence Agreement 2000–04, it was decided to merge the Guard Hussar Regiment with the Zealand Life Regiment and the Danish Life Regiment. With this amalgamation of the three infantry regiments, the name and history of the new regiment had to be decided. This led to what the media called "the Colonels' War", with the three colonels fighting for their regiment’s name and history to survive.
The Chief of Defence, Christian Hvidt, ordered the old insignia removed, which was not customary. The new armoured horse head was nicknamed the "biker patch". Furthermore, it was decided that a colour be used alongside the standard.

Modern times
Following the amalgamation, the Guard Hussar Regiment has participated in a number of international missions, resulting in the loss of 16 soldiers.

Structure
Today the Gardehusarregiment is classed as a cavalry regiment, it is in fact a mixed armoured and infantry unit, with three battalions:
  1st Battalion – Armoured Infantry (part of 1st Brigade)
  Staff Company
  1st Armoured Infantry Company (1/I/GHR)
  2nd Mechanised Infantry Company (2/I/GHR)
  4th Mechanised Infantry Company (4/I/GHR) (inactive)
  3rd Battalion – Reconnaissance (part of 2nd Brigade) motto:Nec temere nec timide (Neither random nor timidly)
  Staff Platoon (Inactive)
  1st Light Reconnaissance Squadron (1 LOPKESK)
  2nd Light Reconnaissance Squadron (2 LOPKESK)
  3rd Light Reconnaissance Squadron (inactive)
  Marine Squadron (4th Basic Training Squadron) 

  5th Battalion – Basic Training (part of 2nd Brigade)  motto:Terror in Hostes – Vor fjender til frygt
   Staff Company (Inactive)
  1st Basic Training Company motto:Fremad på ny – hurtig og adræt (Forward again - fast and agile)
  2nd Basic Training Company (Livkompagniet) motto:Fremad på ny – lige på og hårdt (Forward again - head on)
 4th Mechanised Infantry Company (4/V/GHR)
  Mounted Squadron – Public duties/ceremonial

Disbanded Units
   II/GHR Armoured Battalion (1955−1976), Infantry Battalion (1977-2000), Armoured Infantry Battalion (2001-2018)
   IV/GHR Infantry Battalion (1983−1996), Armoured Infantry Battalion  (1997-2013).
   VI/GHR Infantry Battalion (2000-2004). 
   VII/GHR Infantry Battalion (2000-2004).

Names of the regiment

References

External links
 

Military units and formations established in 2001
Danish Army regiments
Guards regiments
Cavalry regiments of Denmark
Military of Denmark